Li Qing (8th century–775), known as Li Mao (李瑁) from 725 and honored title Prince of Shou (壽王) was a prince of the Tang Dynasty. He was the 18th son of Emperor Xuanzong and his favorite concubine Consort Wu.

Family 
Father:Emperor Xuanzong of Tang
Mother: Empress Zhenshun, of the Wu clan (貞順皇后 武氏; 699–737)
Consorts and issue: 
Consort Yang,  of the Yang clan of Hongnong (弘農楊氏; 719–756)
Consort Wei, of the Wei clan of Jingzhao (京兆韦氏), 3rd daughter of general Wei Zhaoxun (韦昭训)
Unknown: 
Li Ai, Prince of Deyang (德陽郡王李僾), first son
Li Bei, Prince of Jiyang (济陽郡王李伓), second son 
Li Zhan, Prince of Guangyang (广陽郡王李偡), third son
Li Kang, Duke of Xue (薛国公李伉), fourth son
Li Jie (李傑), fifth son
Sixth daughter
Li Yingxuan (李应玄), 22nd daughter

Biography
Li Mao  (德陽郡王李僾), was the son of Emperor Xuanzong of Tang and his favorite consort, Consort Wu.
In 733, Li Mao married the beautiful Yang Yuhuan (楊玉環), daughter of Yang Xuanyan (楊玄琰) who was then the census official of Shu Prefecture (now 蜀州, in modern Chengdu, Sichuan). After his mother's death, Yang Yuhuan came into Xuanzong's favor and the emperor decided to take her as his consort. However, since Princess Yang was already the wife of his son, Emperor Xuanzong stealthily arranged for her to become a Taoist nun with the tonsured name Taizhen in order to prevent criticisms that would affect his plan of making her his concubine. Yang then stayed for a brief while as a Taoist nun in the palace itself, before Emperor Xuanzong made her an imperial consort after bestowing his son Li Mao a new wife. Yang henceforth became the favorite consort of the emperor like Consort Wu before.

Ancestry

References
 New Book of Tang, vol. 76
 Old Book of Tang, vol. 107 and New Book of Tang, vol. 82.

Notes

Tang dynasty imperial princes
8th-century births
775 deaths
Emperor Xuanzong of Tang